Byz (born 1984) is a Swedish hip hop musician.

Byz may also refer to:

 Abbreviation for Byzantium
 Big Byz, a fictional flying city in the 2011 science fiction novel S.N.U.F.F.

See also
Biz (disambiguation)